The Germany women's national under-20 basketball team is a national basketball team of Germany, administered by the German Basketball Federation. It represents the country in women's international under-20 basketball competitions.

FIBA U20 Women's European Championship participations

See also
Germany women's national basketball team
Germany women's national under-19 basketball team

References

External links
Archived records of Germany team participations

Basketball in Germany
Basketball
Women's national under-20 basketball teams